On 10 December 2022, anti-government protests broke out in Bangladesh. Tens of thousands marched in Dhaka demanding the resignation of Prime Minister of Bangladesh Sheikh Hasina. The protests were linked to rising commodity costs and inflation as a result of the Russia-Ukraine conflict.

Events 
On 8 December, hundreds were arrested and one protestor was reported killed by police.

References 

Protests in Bangladesh
2022 protests
December 2022 events in Asia
2022 in Bangladesh